Ivorian Liberation Movement (in French: Mouvement ivorien de libération) was an Ivorian opposition group, founded in 1959 in Paris.

Reference

Defunct political parties in Ivory Coast
Political parties in French West Africa
1959 establishments in France
Political parties established in 1959